Beaverboard (also beaver board) is a fiberboard building material, formed of wood fibre compressed into sheets. It was originally a trademark for a lumber product built up from the fibre of clean white spruce
made from 1906 until 1928 by the Beaver Manufacturing Company at their plant in Beaver Falls and marketed from from their headquarters in Beaver Rd, Buffalo, New York.

Beaverboard has occasionally been used as a canvas by artists. The painting American Gothic (1930) by Grant Wood was painted on a beaverboard panel.

See also
Paperboard

References

Building materials